The Portrait of the Pestilence is a 2008 stop motion-animated short film written, directed and animated by Lucila Las Heras.

Plot
Away in a tower, somewhere in Europe during the Middle Ages, Benjamin, a young painting apprentice, lives happily with his teacher, devoting his life to art. But the arrival of a mysterious plague threatens all they have.

Awards
 2008 - Mejor Cortometraje de Animación (Best Animation Short Film) 3er. Festival Pizza, Birra y Cortos (Gálvez, Santa Fé, Argentina)
 2008 - Mejor Cortometraje de Animación (Best Animation Short Film) AV Al Extremo Cortos (Río Gallegos, Santa Cruz, Argentina)
 2009 - Mejor Cortometraje (Best Short Film) II Festival Gualeguaychú Suma Cine (Gualeguaychú, Entre Ríos, Argentina)

External links
 

2008 films
Animated films without speech
2000s stop-motion animated films
Argentine animated short films
2000s Argentine films